Penzberg station, also known as Penzberg Pbf, is a railway station in the city of Penzberg, in Bavaria, Germany. It is located on the Kochelsee line of Deutsche Bahn.

Services
 the following services stop at Penzberg:

References

External links
 
 Penzberg layout 
 

Railway stations in Bavaria
Buildings and structures in Weilheim-Schongau